Liu Ke (Chinese: 刘珂), better known as captainMo, is a Chinese professional Counter-Strike: Global Offensive (CS:GO) player and former Counter-Strike: Source (CS:S) and Counter-Strike (CS) player. CaptainMo played for team Tyloo for most of his career and currently play for team Triumphant Song Gaming.

Professional career 
After team wNv, the first Chinese CS team won the world title, was disbanded in 2010, team Tyloo became the only big club which remained its CS roster in China. In 2011, captainMo joined Tyloo after the release of game Counter-Strike: Global Offensive (CS:GO). Later, captainMo became the in-game leader of Tyloo because of his good skills and game sense. He was well known in CS:GO community after Tyloo beat Team LG and Team Liquid in DreamHack Masters Malmö 2016. In 2018, Tyloo beat Team Spirit 2:0 in the final and became the first Asian team that advanced to CS:GO Major.

Notable Results

Live Stream 

On March 13, 2019, captainMo started his live streaming with former professional Counter-Strike (CS) player Maxixi in Huya TV. They formed a group called CSBOY that has more than 2.2 million followers on stream.

Personal life 
On May 28, 2020, captainMo married Liu Daxi.

References 

Counter-Strike players
Living people
Chinese esports players
Year of birth missing (living people)